Tribble Reese (Herbert Tribble Reese; born July 27, 1985, in Atlanta, Georgia) is an American television personality, model, bartender and ex-college athlete.

Biography 
Tribble Reese is best known for starring in season 2 of Sweet Home Alabama, an eight episode CMT television series, produced by Glassman Media ("Three Wishes"). Reese was also ranked among the top 50 Hot Bachelors of 2008 by Cosmopolitan magazine, where he was named South Carolina's Bachelor of the Year.

Reese grew up in Birmingham, Alabama and began playing football in 1993. His professional career got its start at Mountain Brook High School in Birmingham, where he was ranked in 2004 as the 15th dual-threat quarterback in the nation by Rivals.com. An ex-college NCAA Division I Big South Conference football quarterback.  He was a backup quarterback at Clemson University before transferring and becoming the starting quarterback at Charleston Southern University, another NCAA Division I school based out of South Carolina.

As a back-up quarterback with the Clemson Tigers, Reese roomed with Demayne Board and accumulated two touchdowns and a 62.5 completion percentage in the 2006–2007 season. His transfer to CSU as a fifth-year MBA student placed Reese in the position of the school's first-string quarterback, a move that has expanded his existing game stats to include 21 touchdowns, 1,961 yards passing, and a 133.5 quarterback efficiency rating. Reese also had a stint of arena football in Charlotte, North Carolina with the Carolina Speed in 2009

Tribble is currently involved in giving back specializing in helping local charities including Angel Ride in Mobile, AL, The Exceptional Foundation. in Birmingham, AL and others around the Atlanta area.

Reese stars as himself in the 2013 Bravo Reality Series "The New Atlanta".

Reese played football again in 2014 for the Elmshorn Fighting Pirates – a second division team in Germany. Reese completed 158 of 298 pass attempts through twelve games for 2,483 passing yards and 18 touchdowns. He finished third in the division in passing yards per game (206,9 avg/Game).

References

External links 
 Tribble Reese's website
 Clemson Tigers bio

1985 births
Living people
Players of American football from Atlanta
Players of American football from Birmingham, Alabama
Clemson Tigers football players
Charleston Southern Buccaneers football players
American television personalities
Male models from Georgia (U.S. state)
American bartenders
American football quarterbacks